Shovelnose may refer to:

 A type of American Indian canoe
 A type of streamlined railway locomotive
 A banjo shark